Raju Gayashan (born 23 June 1988) is a Sri Lankan cricketer. He made his first-class debut on 17 November 2006, for Lankan Cricket Club in the 2006–07 Premier Trophy.

References

External links
 

1988 births
Living people
Sri Lankan cricketers
Burgher Recreation Club cricketers
Lankan Cricket Club cricketers
Panadura Sports Club cricketers
Place of birth missing (living people)